This article lists the largest nuclear power stations in the United States, in terms of Nameplate capacity.

See also
List of largest power plants in the United States
 List of the largest coal power stations in the United States
 Largest hydroelectric power plants in the United States
List of largest power stations in the world
List of wind farms in the United States
List of nuclear power stations
Electricity sector of the United States

References

Nuclear